is a Japanese pianist and actress from Oota, Tokyo. After graduating from Ferris High School in Yokohama and later studied at the Royal Academy of Music in London. In 2001, she won first prize of the Maria Canals International Music Competition.

References

External links
Official website

1981 births
Alumni of the Royal Academy of Music
Japanese women pianists
Japanese women musicians
Japanese pianists
Living people
Maria Canals International Music Competition prize-winners
21st-century Japanese pianists
21st-century Japanese women musicians
21st-century women pianists